Casandra Alexander (born 13 August 1999) is a South African professional golfer playing on the Ladies European Tour. In 2020, she won the team event at the Saudi Ladies Team International.

She competed as Casandra Hall until her marriage to Adrian Alexander, a bodybuilder, in 2022.

Career
Alexander started playing golf at age 10 and her foremost achievement as an amateur was winning the South African Stroke Play Championship in 2018.

Alexander turned professional in late 2018 and joined the Sunshine Ladies Tour. In 2020, she won the Ladies Event at the Investec Royal Swazi Open, and in 2021, the Joburg Ladies Open. She finished second in the 2021 Order of Merit, behind Lee-Anne Pace.

Alexander become a member of the Ladies European Tour in January 2020, but missed most of the season due to the COVID-19 pandemic, unable to travel to Europe. In November, she made her breakthrough with victory in the Saudi Ladies Team International alongside Emily Kristine Pedersen and Michele Thomson. She holed the winning putt for a closing birdie on the 54th hole, sealing the victory for her team.

In 2021, she played 12 LET events and finished 73rd in the Order of Merit. In 2022, she tied for 4th at the Investec South African Women's Open three strokes behind the winner, her compatriot Lee-Anne Pace.

Amateur wins
2018 South African Stroke Play Championship, Limpopo Championship 

Source:

Professional wins (4)

Sunshine Ladies Tour wins (4)

References

External links

South African female golfers
Ladies European Tour golfers
Golfers from Johannesburg
1999 births
Living people